Charles X. Zimmerman (January 18, 1865 – November 14, 1926) was an American brigadier general during World War I, businessman and  politician. He was also the vice president of the first American Football League, as well as the owner of the league's Cleveland Panthers.

Biography

Military career 
On May 8, 1884, Zimmerman enlisted in the Fifth Ohio Infantry. He commanded Company F, Fifth Ohio Infantry during the Spanish–American War. He served in the Ohio National Guard and was promoted to brigadier general (NA) on August 5, 1917. Zimmerman was commanding general of the 73rd Infantry Brigade, part of the 37th Infantry Division; he was discharged on February 5, 1919. He served at Camp Sheridan, Alabama, Camp Lee, and Camp Beauregarde, Louisiana. During the Meuse-Argonne Offensive, he served in the defensive sector along with the AEF.

Cleveland Panthers
In 1946, Zimmerman's "Panthers" moniker was ranked second in a contest sponsored by the Cleveland Plain Dealer for fans to name Cleveland's new All-America Football Conference franchise. Coach Paul Brown did not want the new team named after him, so he looked into naming the club the Panthers. However the team's secretary, George T. Jones, reportedly demanded too much money and the team was instead named the Cleveland Browns.

Personal life
Zimmerman married twice in his life, first to Anna Hill- who died in December 1897- and then to Ethel Vogt on June 5, 1900. He died unexpectedly in New York City on November 14, 1926. He was buried at Knollwood Cemetery in Mayfield Heights, Ohio.

References

1865 births
1926 deaths
Businesspeople from Cleveland
People from Euclid, Ohio
American military personnel of the Spanish–American War
United States Army generals of World War I
United States Army generals
Burials at Knollwood Cemetery
Military personnel from Ohio